Việt Quang is a township and capital of Bắc Quang District, Hà Giang Province, Vietnam.

References

Populated places in Hà Giang province
District capitals in Vietnam
Townships in Vietnam